Tommy Tegelgård (born 24 October 1948) is a Swedish judoka. He competed in the men's middleweight event at the 1972 Summer Olympics.

References

1948 births
Living people
Swedish male judoka
Olympic judoka of Sweden
Judoka at the 1972 Summer Olympics
Sportspeople from Stockholm
20th-century Swedish people